Hiadeľ is a village and municipality of the Banská Bystrica District in the Banská Bystrica Region of Slovakia

History
In historical records, the village was first mentioned in 1424. It belonged to the castle of Slovenská Ľupča.

References

External links
https://web.archive.org/web/20080111223415/http://www.statistics.sk/mosmis/eng/run.html
http://www.e-obce.sk/obec/hiadel/hiadel.html

Villages and municipalities in Banská Bystrica District